Drall may refer to:

 Drall (Star Control species), a fictional alien race in the Star Control franchise
 Drall (Star Wars species), a fictional alien race in the Star Wars franchise